Jon Wauford (born February 11, 1970) is an American football player and former coach. He currently serves as the head coach at Clinton High School in Clinton, Iowa. He served as the head football coach at Clinton High School in Clinton, Iowa. He served as the head football coach at the University of Findlay in Findlay, Ohio from 2007 to 2010, compiling a record of 14–30.

Head coaching record

College

References

1970 births
Living people
American football defensive linemen
Findlay Oilers football coaches
Kent State Golden Flashes football coaches
Las Vegas Posse players
Miami RedHawks football coaches
Miami RedHawks football players
High school football coaches in Iowa